Dębowo  is a village in the administrative district of Gmina Sztabin, within Augustów County, Podlaskie Voivodeship, in north-eastern Poland.

Notable people

 Adrian Krzyżanowski, mathematician and translator of German literature (1788-1852)

References

Villages in Augustów County
Suwałki Governorate
Białystok Voivodeship (1919–1939)
Belastok Region